In enzymology, a leucine 2,3-aminomutase is an enzyme that catalyzes the chemical reaction

(2S)-alpha-leucine  (3R)-beta-leucine

Hence, this enzyme is responsible for the conversion of -leucine to β-leucine.

This enzyme belongs to the family of isomerases, specifically those intramolecular transferases transferring amino groups.  The systematic name of this enzyme class is (2S)-alpha-leucine 2,3-aminomutase. This enzyme participates in valine, leucine and isoleucine degradation.  It employs one cofactor, cobamide.

References

 
 
 

EC 5.4.3
Cobamide enzymes
Enzymes of unknown structure